Nelson Marlborough Institute of Technology (NMIT) is a public tertiary education institution at the top of the South Island in New Zealand. NMIT's main campus is in Nelson with other campuses in Blenheim, Marlborough, Woodbourne and Richmond. It has been providing tertiary education in the Nelson-Marlborough region since 1904. NMIT offers 100 programmes at certificate, diploma or degree level across a broad range of areas and has a yearly enrollment of around 3,000 equivalent full-time students, locally, nationally and internationally.

NMIT is an NZQA approved Category 1 tertiary education provider and ISO 9001 certified.

The region's economy includes New Zealand's largest concentration of fisheries, wine and aquaculture. It also has substantial forestry, horticulture, aviation, tourism and arts industries as well as a sizable conservation estate, including three national parks. NMIT has developed programmes that sustain the region's infrastructure as well as specialized programmes in niche areas.

NMIT's programmes include Viticulture, Aquaculture, Nursing, Maritime, Adventure Tourism, Creative Industries, Business and Computing. It also delivers a wide range of trade qualifications.

On 1 April 2020, NMIT was subsumed into New Zealand Institute of Skills & Technology alongside the 15 other Institutes of Technology and Polytechnics (ITPs).

References

External links
 Nelson Marlborough Institute of Technology

Te Pūkenga – New Zealand Institute of Skills and Technology
Education in the Marlborough Region
Buildings and structures in Blenheim, New Zealand
Nelson, New Zealand
Education in the Nelson Region
2020 disestablishments in New Zealand